Sobekhotep or Sebekhotep is an ancient Egyptian name meaning “Sobek is pleased” or “Sobek is satisfied”, and may refer to:


Pharaohs

13th Dynasty
 Sekhemre Khutawy Sobekhotep, believed to be Sobekhotep I
 Khaankhre Sobekhotep, believed to be Sobekhotep II
 Sobekhotep III, reigned c. 1740 BC
 Sobekhotep IV, most powerful pharaoh of the 13th Dynasty, c. 1730 BC
 Merhotepre Sobekhotep, also known as Sobekhotep V, reigned c. 1724 BC
 Sobekhotep VI, reigned c. 1696 BC
 Merkawre Sobekhotep, reigned c. 1664 BC

16th Dynasty
 Sobekhotep VIII, reigned c. 1645 BC

Nobles
 Sobekhotep (treasurer) (12th dynasty)
 Sobekhotep (13th dynasty), son of Seneb, the brother of Sobekhotep III
 Sobekhotep (13th dynasty), grandfather of Queen Nubkhaes
 Sobekhotep Miu (13th dynasty), son of Sobekhotep IV
 Sobekhotep Djadja (13th dynasty), son of Sobekhotep IV
 Sobekhotep (13th dynasty), brother of Neferhotep I and Sobekhotep IV
 Sobekhotep (13th dynasty), son of Sobekhotep VII
 Sobekhotep (16th dynasty), mother of Queen Mentuhotep
 Sobekhotep (16th dynasty), possibly a son of Dedumose I
Sobekhotep (mayor of the Faiyum) (18th dynasty)
 Sobekhotep (New Kingdom treasurer)

See also 
 Sobekneferu, last ruler of the Twelfth Dynasty
 Sobek, nomen of an unidentified pharaoh of the early 13th Dynasty, possibly Nerikare or Sekhemrekhutawy Khabaw

Ancient Egyptian given names
Theophoric names